"Betcha'll Never Find" is the debut single by Chantay Savage, from her debut album Here We Go.... The song was a top 20 hit on both the Billboard R&B Singles and Dance Club Songs charts, peaking at number seventeen on both charts.

Tracklisting
Maxi-promo CD
 "Betcha'll Never Find" (Radio Version) [3:48]
 "Betcha'll Never Find" (Old Skool Version) [4:00]
 "Betcha'll Never Find" (Dave Shaw Mix) [3:35]
 "Betcha'll Never Find" (12" Extended Version) [5:44]
 "Betcha'll Never Find" (Old Skool Extended Version) [5:12]

Charts

Weekly charts

Year-end charts

References

1994 debut singles
1994 songs
RCA Records singles
Chantay Savage songs
Songs written by Steve "Silk" Hurley
Songs written by Chantay Savage